Jeleniów  is a village in the administrative district of Gmina Lewin Kłodzki, within Kłodzko County, Lower Silesian Voivodeship, in south-western Poland. The village has a population of 620.

Peter von Biron, last Duke of Courland and Semigallia died at Jeleniów Palace on January 13, 1800.

References

Villages in Kłodzko County